Destiny is the thirteenth studio album released by American band the Jacksons, recorded in part at Dawnbreaker Studios – San Fernando, California. It was released on December 18, 1978 on Epic Records and CBS Records. The album would eventually sell over four million copies worldwide, two million in America during its initial run and another two million worldwide. The album marked the first time in the band's career in which they had complete artistic control, and was also the first album produced by the brothers who promoted it with a year-long world tour.

History

Overview
The band had left their longtime label Motown in 1975 (except for brother Jermaine Jackson who had stayed with Motown after he married Berry Gordy's daughter, Hazel Gordy), and after a few years of being with Philly International, the Jacksons set their sights on one of Columbia Records' most popular labels, Epic. After having their previous albums spearheaded by legendary producers Kenny Gamble and Leon Huff, Epic allowed the Jackson brothers to write and produce their own material for the first time in their career, something that Motown did not permit. Composing much of the album in their home-made recording studio in their gated Hayvenhurst mansion, the group finished recording the album within two months.

This album was the first album to include songs written by the Jacksons themselves.  Every song was credited to the Jacksons as a band or individually to Michael and Randy, with the exception of the lead single, "Blame It on the Boogie." That song was written (somewhat confusingly)  by a British singer-songwriter named Mick Jackson, who was not related to the members of the Jacksons.

Like many of the acts that had left Motown, the Jacksons had to accept the possibility that they would no longer enjoy the same level of success they had while they were associated with the label—something Motown themselves reiterated upon hearing that longtime front man Michael Jackson had moved on to a full-fledged solo career following Destiny'''s release.

Release and reaction
Released on December 18, 1978, Destiny re-established them as a top-selling group. The single, "Blame It on the Boogie", was released on September 23, 1978, as the advance single from the album. Although "Blame It on the Boogie" returned the Jacksons to the Hot 100 it was not the single to effect a major comeback for the Jacksons peaking at No. 54. However, "Blame It on the Boogie" did reach No. 3 R&B and would be coupled with "Shake Your Body (Down to the Ground)" on an extended club play single which would reach No. 20 on the dance charts in 1979. "Blame It on the Boogie" rose to number 8 in the UK.

The album's success was largely based on the second single released from the album, "Shake Your Body (Down to the Ground)", which became a Top 10 single in the spring of 1979. The album eventually peaked at number eleven on the Billboard Pop Albums chart and number three on the Billboard Black Albums chart and went on to Platinum status-cementing it as the first RIAA-certified platinum seller by the Jacksons as most of their Motown recordings were uncertifiable despite their huge success on the charts, and over two million copies worldwide. The accompanying tour was a huge success running on many legs and also toured overseas.

Album cover
The album's artwork, painted by Gary Meyer, has Jackie, Tito, Michael, Randy, and Marlon on top of the word "DESTINY" (the album's title) carved in stone during a thunderstorm containing a whirlwind and stormy waters splashing against the "DESTINY" monolith. A peacock is shown on the back cover fanning his tail and has a message provided by Michael and Jackie for Peacock Productions: "Through the ages, the peacock has been honored and praised for its attractive, illustrious beauty. Of all the bird family, the peacock is the only bird that integrates all colors into one, and displays this radiance of fire only when in love. We, like the peacock, try to integrate all races into one through the love of music."

Re-release
In honor of its 30th anniversary, Destiny, including two bonus tracks of rare 12-inch disco mixes previously unavailable on CD, was released on January 27, 2009, on Epic/Legacy, a division of Sony Music Entertainment. Both unreleased tracks were mixed by John Luongo. Later in 2021 it returned to re-released album again in digital format on February 12, 2021 including The Jacksons and Goin' Places''.

Track listing

Personnel

The Jacksons

 Michael Jackson – lead vocals, vocal arrangements
 Jackie Jackson – lead vocals (track 6), backing vocals, vocal arrangements
 Marlon Jackson – backing vocals, vocal arrangements
 Tito Jackson – guitars, backing vocals, vocal arrangements
 Randy Jackson – congas (3, 5–8), vocal arrangements, percussion (3), backing vocals

Additional musicians
 Roland Bautista – guitar (1, 2)
 Paul Jackson, Jr. – guitar (3, 5, 7, 8), guitar solo (6)
 Michael Sembello – guitar (1, 2, 5–8), bass (2)
 Michael Boddicker – synthesizers (4)
 Greg Phillinganes – keyboards, synthesizers (4, 8), rhythm arrangements
 Gary King – bass (1)
 Nathan Watts – bass (1, 3, 5–8)
 Ed Greene – drums (4–8)
 Ricky Lawson – drums (3)
 Rick Marotta – drums (1, 2), percussion (1)
 Paulinho da Costa – percussion (3, 4)
 Laudir de Oliveira – congas (1)
 Claudio Slon – congas (1)
 Seawind Horns – trumpet, saxophone, flute

Production
 Produced by The Jacksons
 Bobby Colomby, Mike Atkinson – executive producers
 Don Murray, Peter Granet – engineer
 Clare Fischer – string arrangement (2)
 Tom Tom 84 – horn arrangements (3–8), string arrangements (4–6, 8)
 Jerry Hey – horn arrangements (1, 2)

Technical
 Graphic coordinator: Tony Lane
 Cover artwork by Gary Meyer
 Photography by Jeffrey Scales

Charts

Weekly charts

Year-end charts

Certifications

Notes

External links
 The Jacksons – Destiny (1978) album releases & credits at Discogs

1978 albums
The Jackson 5 albums
Epic Records albums
Albums produced by Michael Jackson
Albums produced by Bobby Colomby
Albums arranged by Clare Fischer
Albums recorded at Record Plant (Los Angeles)
Albums recorded at Total Experience Recording Studios